is a Japanese Nippon Professional Baseball pitcher with the Yokohama DeNA BayStars in Japan's Central League.

External links

Living people
1983 births
Baseball people from Kyoto Prefecture
Japanese baseball players
Nippon Professional Baseball pitchers
Fukuoka Daiei Hawks players
Fukuoka SoftBank Hawks players
Yokohama DeNA BayStars players